This is a list of Spanish television related events from 1966.

Events 
 24 June: Historias para no dormir episode El asfalto directed by de Narciso Ibáñez Serrador wins the  Golden Nymph Award in the Monte-Carlo Television Festival.
 15 November: La 2 by Televisión Española is launched. Second television service in Spain.

Debuts 

  La 1
 Diego Acevedo
 Los encuentros
 Habitación 508
 Hermenegildo Pérez, para servirle  
 Nosotras y ellos
 La pequeña comedia
 Teatro breve  
 El tercer rombo
 El alma se serena
 Aquí España  
 Biblioteca juvenil  
 Cartas de las provincias
 Ciencias para la vida
 The Chiripitiflauticos
 Club mediodía  
 El cohete
 Conozca usted España
 ¿Cuál es tu final?
 Danzas de España
 Día de fiesta  
 Diga 33
 Escuela de campeones
 España al día
 Figuras en su mundo
 Las fronteras de la ciencia
 Galería de solistas
 Gran premio  
 Habitación 508  
 Historias de ayer y de hoy
 El hombre de mundo
 Hombres y tierras
 Hombres que dejan huella  
 Historia de la fotografía
 Historias de la paz
 Hombres en crisis
 Horizontes
 Imagen del ayer
 Imágenes para saber  
 Jardilín  
 Juegos y juguetes
 Kilómetro lanzado
 La llamada al diálogo
 La pequeña comedia
 Lecciones de cosas
 Noche del sábado  
 El que dice ser y llamarse
 Kilómetro lanzado
 El lápiz mágico
 Los libros
 Llamada al diálogo  
 Media hora con...  
 Meditación
 Misterios al descubierto  
 Momento cultural
 Mundo de hoy
 Musical
 La música
 Noches de verano
 Nuestro tiempo
 Nueva generación
 Nueva geografía
 Los números
 La palabra más larga
 Panorama de actualidad
 La pesca
 Por los caminos de España  
 Programa extraordinario
 Protagonista, el hombre  
 Revista agraria
 La risa nueva
 Saber elegir
 Salta a la vista
 Sesenta y siete
 Siete preguntas al concilio
 Símbolos y ritos
 Siglo XXI
 Tele-Ritmo
 Tendido 13
 Tiempo atrás
 Trece por Dieciocho
 El tiempo para el campo
 TVE es noticia  
 Una pista en la ciudad
 Ventana al mundo
 La 2
 Dichoso mundo  
 Teatro de siempre
 Telecomedia de humor  
 1+1=3 y sobra 1
 A todo gas
 Ateneo
 Autores invitados  
 Cine-Club
 Enviado especial
 Estudio en negro
 Fiesta
 Gama  
 Hoy es noticia
 El juego de la oca
 Luces en la noche  
 Luz verde  
 Mañana es sábado  
 Mesa redonda
 Música en la intimidad
 El mundo del deporte
 Pantalla grande
 Sospecha
 Suplemento semanal
 Concurso náutico
 Conexión

Television shows

La 1

Ending this year

La 1

Foreign series debuts in Spain

La 1

Births 
 22 January – Víctor Arribas, journalist.
 2 February – Emma Ozores, actress.
 13 March – Marcial Álvarez, actor.
 23 March – Belén Rodríguez, pundit.
 1 April – Gerardo Garrido, actor.
 26 May – Félix Álvarez, host.
 13 June – Luis Merlo, actor. 	
 21 June – Leticia Sabater, hostess.
 5 July – Juanma Ortega, host.
 31 August – Juncal Rivero, hostess.
 5 September – Achero Mañas, actor.
 10 September – Josep Pedrerol, host.
 13 September – Francine Gálvez, hostess.
 1 October – Loreto Valverde, hostess.
 1 October – Nina, singer.
 22 October – Fran Llorente, journalist.
 30 October – Carmen Borrego, director & pundit.
 17 December – Paloma Ferre, journalist.
 22 December – María Pujalte, actress.
 25 December – Patricia Gaztañaga, hostess.
 Santiago Acosta, host.

See also 
 1966 in Spain
 List of Spanish films of 1966

References